57th Brigade of 57th Infantry Brigade may refer to:

 57th Indian Brigade of the British Indian Army in the First World War
 57th Brigade (United Kingdom)
 57th Motorized Brigade (Ukraine)

See also
 57th Division (disambiguation)
 57th Regiment (disambiguation)